Poznań–Ławica Henryk Wieniawski Airport , built in 1913, is one of the oldest airports in Poland. It takes its name from the neighborhood of Ławica, part of the city's Grunwald district, while the airport actually lies in the Jeżyce district.

Synopsis
The northern section has been used as a military airport since its inception in 1913 as an Imperial German airbase until 23 December 2009. The southern section is used for civilian purposes. The prospect of relocating the airport elsewhere is often raised as a result of the flight path to the runway being located directly over the city.

The airport caters for international, domestic and cargo flights and general aviation. A new terminal was opened in 2012 and can handle up to 3.5 million passengers per year.

Confusion with Poznań–Krzesiny military airport
Poznań–Ławica airport has been confused by pilots with a nearby airbase, Poznań–Krzesiny Airbase (ICAO code: EPKS), which also has a  runway. The runways are at approximately the same orientation: Ławica's is 11/29 (true heading: 108/288) and Krzesiny's is 12/30 (true heading: 117.9/297.9). The two runways lie in a nearly straight line, with Krzesiny coming up first on approaches from the east, the ones used most often. On the other hand, the Krzesiny airbase has two runways and lies southeast from the city centre, while Poznań–Ławica lies just west of it.

One notable incident involving confusion between Ławica and Krzesiny happened on 15 August 2006, when a Sky Airlines aircraft - a Boeing 737-800 running flight number SKY335 - mistook the runway at Krzesiny for the one being used in Ławica, landing at the military base by accident. The aircraft later took off on a repositioning flight to the correct airfield.

According to Krzysztof Krawcewicz, a pilot and the editor-in-chief of the Polish monthly Przegląd Lotniczy/Aviation Revue, this was at least the seventh mistaken aircraft that landed at the Poznań–Krzesiny airfield in 2006 alone. He faults, among others, the "scandalous procedures which are in use by the air traffic control at Poznań–Ławica" and the lack of radar use in controlling aircraft landing, which, although a radar system is present at Ławica, has been shut off, most likely due to the nearby military base.

Airlines and destinations
The following airlines operate regular scheduled and charter flights at Poznań–Ławica Airport:

Statistics

Incidents and accidents
 On 10 June 1952, a Petlyakov Pe-2 bomber from the 21st Reconnaissance Regiment took off from Ławica air base for a training flight, but crashed shortly thereafter near the Warta river as a result of engine failure. The crash killed the bomber's crew: chorąży Zdzisław Lara (pilot), chorąży Stanisław Kuć (navigator) and corporal Józef Bednarek (rear gunner/radio operator), as well as six civilians on the ground. Due to the fact that the aircraft was made in the Soviet Union, the crash was covered up by the Communist authorities and the official reports put the blame on the pilot instead of equipment. In 2008, a monument was unveiled at the crash site.

Public ground transportation
Poznań transit (MPK Poznań) lines number 159 and 222 stop at the arrival area of the airport and provide a connection to Poznań Główny railway station. The trip takes approximately 20 minutes. There is also a bus stop for 148 nearby.

See also
 List of airports in Poland
 Air ambulances in Poland

References

External links

Airports in Poland
Buildings and structures in Poznań
Airport